The Fairfax Millions is a 1980 Soviet crime film directed by Nikolai Ilinsky based on Alan Winnington's novel of the same name.

Plot
An influential businessman, millionaire Anthony Fairfax, suffers from a serious illness. With the help of Dr. Jones, a heart transplant operation is performed on him using the heart taken from his brother. Paul Fairfax is a young scapegrace, who eagerly waits the death of Anthony, and is the only legitimate heir to his vast fortune. His heart is genetically the most suitable for transplantation, and on the advice of the doctors Anthony Fairfax agrees to a double murder - Paul and a certain Mr. Jackson, who is supposed to play the role of a donor.

Russell Jones, Dr. of Fairfax is the lover of his young wife and receives an annual solid grant for research. Fearing that with the death of Anthony the payments will stop, he dreams of getting several hundred thousand pounds and going abroad. For greater confidence in success, he goes on deception and tells Fairfax about the practical completion of his work on creating an artificial heart.

On the trail of criminals, with the help of Jones' former lover, the experienced inspector Percy Gallet, appointed by the ministry, comes around. He organizes a surveillance of the house, waits until Jones arrives, and is about to arrest both of them. Fairfax kills Jones, and his people murder Gallet. Evening news reports the culpability in all the murders of Dr. Russell Jones, allegedly suffering from manic psychosis.

Cast
Juozas Budraitis — Anthony Fairfax, a millionaire
Grazhyna Baikshtite — Marilyn Fairfax, wife of Anthony
Ilmar Tammour — Inspector Percy Gallet
Alexander Martynov — Russell Jones, transplant surgeon
Helga Dantzberg — Lucy Downtree
Povilas Gaidis — Tiggy Downtree
Gediminas Girdvainis — Sergeant Fitzgerald, Assistant Inspector Galleta
Juris Strenga — George Burns
Galina Loginova — Molly Firren, secretary of Dr. Jones
Ivars Kalniņš — Paul Fairfax, brother of Antoni
Vladimir Ehrenberg — Joshua Ward
Milena Tontegode — Gully
Yevgeny Vesnik — High Commissioner of Police
Vladimir Tkachenko is Adjutant General Commex
Dmitry Mirgorodsky — police detective
Yuri Leonidov — General Cummins
Volodymyr Talashko — Malcolm Treddic
Vladimir Shakalo — Arthur Cook
Paul Butkevich — Police Commissioner
Lydia Chaschina — Elsa Jackson

References

External links

Dovzhenko Film Studios films
Films scored by Eduard Artemyev
Soviet crime drama films
1980 crime drama films
1980 films